Back to You is the debut studio album by American country music artist Anita Cochran. It was released in 1997 by Warner Bros. Records and peaked at number 24 on the Billboard Top Country Albums chart. The album includes the singles "I Could Love a Man Like That," "Daddy Can You See Me," "Will You Be Here?", and "What If I Said," a duet with Steve Wariner which reached number 1 on Hot Country Songs.

Critical reception
Giving it 4 out of 5 stars, Allmusic reviewer Thom Owens wrote that "for most of Back to You, Cochran's music is unpredictable and exciting, as her songwriting is inspired and her musicianship is fresh. It's a first-rate debut."

Track listing
All songs written by Anita Cochran except where noted.

Personnel
 Eddie Bayers - drums
 Anita Cochran - banjo, Dobro, electric guitar, lead vocals, background vocals 
 Eric Darken - percussion
 Stuart Duncan - fiddle, viola
 Danny Dunn - steel guitar
 Paul Franklin - steel guitar
 Rob Hajacos - fiddle
 Troy Lancaster - electric guitar
 Terry McMillan - harmonica, percussion
 Phil Madeira - accordion, organ
 Nashville String Machine - strings
 Steve Nathan - piano
 Don Potter - acoustic guitar
 Michael Rhodes - bass guitar
 Matt Rollings - organ, piano
 Brent Rowan - electric guitar
 Steve Wariner - duet vocals on "What If I Said"
 Willie Weeks - bass guitar

Chart performance

References

1997 debut albums
Anita Cochran albums
Warner Records albums
Albums produced by Jim Ed Norman